Ilyinka is a rural locality (a selo) in Podgorenskoye Rural Settlement, Kalacheyevsky District, Voronezh Oblast, Russia. The population was 531 as of 2010. There are 7 streets.

Geography 
Ilyinka is located 11 km east of Kalach (the district's administrative centre) by road. Podgornoye is the nearest rural locality.

References 

Rural localities in Kalacheyevsky District